Flechtingen is a municipality in the Börde district in Saxony-Anhalt, Germany. It is situated approximately 35 km northwest of Magdeburg. On 1 January 2010 it absorbed the former municipalities Behnsdorf, Belsdorf and Böddensell.

Flechtingen is the seat of the Verbandsgemeinde ("collective municipality") Flechtingen.

References

Börde (district)